Hermannsberg may refer to:

Places
 Hermannsberg (Berching), Berching, Neumarkt in der Oberpfalz, Bavaria
 Hermannsberg (Breitbrunn), Breitbrunn, Haßberge, Bavaria
 Hermannsberg (Durach), Durach, Oberallgäu, Bavaria
 Hermannsberg (Heiligenberg), Heiligenberg, Bodenseekreis, Baden-Württemberg
 Hermannsberg (Illschwang), Illschwang, Amberg-Sulzbach, Bavaria
 Hermannsberg (Leuchtenberg), Leuchtenberg, Neustadt an der Waldnaab, Bavaria
 Hermannsberg (Marienheide), Marienheide
 Hermannsberg (St. Georgen im Schwarzwald), St. Georgen im Schwarzwald, Schwarzwald-Baar-Kreis, Baden-Württemberg
 Hermannsberg (Wiesent), Wiesent, Regensburg, Bavaria

Mountains and hills
(Sorted by height)
 Großer Hermannsberg (867.4 m), near Oberschönau in the Thuringian Forest, Schmalkalden-Meiningen, Thuringia
 Hermannsberg (Hesse) (705.1 m), near Rattlar in the Upland (Rothaar Mountains), Waldeck-Frankenberg, Hesse
 Hermannsberg (West Allgäu) (549.5 m), near Achberg in the West Allgäu Hills, Ravensburg, Baden-Württemberg
 Hermannsberg (Upper Palatine Forest) (522 m), near Leuchtenberg, Neustadt an der Waldnaab, Bavaria
 Hermannsberg (Franconian Switzerland) (479 m), near Aufseß, Bayreuth, Bavaria
 Hermannsberg (Bavarian Forest) (404 m), near Wiesent, Regensburg, Bavaria
 Hermannsberg (Steigerwald) (383 m), near Sand am Main, Haßberge, Bavaria
 Hermannsberg (Teutoburg Forest) (363.7 m), near Hörste in the Teutoburg Forest, Lippe, North Rhine-Westphalia
 Hermannsberg (Beckum Hills) (128.2 m), near Beckum in the Beckum Hills, Warendorf, North Rhine-Westphalia

Estates
 Haus Hermannsberg, wine-growing estate in the Lößnitz with the Hermannsberg Vineyard

See also
 Hermannsburg (disambiguation)
 Herrmann Mountains, in Antarctica, known in German as the Herrmannberge
 Herrmannsberg (disambiguation)